The 2021 Colonial Athletic Association women's basketball tournament is a postseason women's basketball tournament for the Colonial Athletic Association for the 2020–21 NCAA Division I women's basketball season. The tournament was held from March 10–13, 2021 at the Schar Center in Elon, North Carolina.  Drexel won the conference tournament championship game over Delaware, 63–52, earning Drexel an automatic bid to the 2021 NCAA Division I women's basketball tournament.

Seeds
William & Mary did not participate in the tournament, as they voluntarily ended their season early due to the COVID-19 pandemic. The remaining 9 were seeded by conference record, with a tiebreaker system used to seed teams with identical conference records. The top seven teams received a bye to the quarterfinals.

Schedule

Bracket

* denotes overtime game

See also
 2021 CAA men's basketball tournament

References

External links
 2021 CAA Women's Basketball Championship

Colonial Athletic Association women's basketball tournament
 
CAA
College basketball tournaments in North Carolina
Elon, North Carolina
Women's sports in North Carolina